Sofiya Lyskun (born 7 February 2002) is a Ukrainian diver, medalist of the European Championships.

Career
She won a bronze medal in 10-meter platform synchro diving (with Valeriia Liulko) at the 2017 European Diving Championships in Kyiv and a gold in the team event (with Oleh Kolodiy) at the multi-event 2018 European Championships in Glasgow.

Lyskun demonstrated her appetite for big meet competition when, aged 15, winning bronze at the 10 metres platform synchro event at the 2017 European Championships in Kiev. In 2018, she performed a difficult dive (a back two-and-a-half somersaults and one-and-a-half twists in pike) for 10 metre board that earned her the highest final round mark of any diver and the gold medal.

She qualified to represent the Ukraine at the 2020 Summer Olympics in the Women's 10 metre platform event.

References

2002 births
Sportspeople from Luhansk
Ukrainian female divers
Living people
Divers at the 2018 Summer Youth Olympics
Divers at the 2020 Summer Olympics
Olympic divers of Ukraine
World Aquatics Championships medalists in diving
21st-century Ukrainian women